Raymond Ameijide (September 14, 1924 – January 11, 2000), sometimes credited as R. Ameijide, was an American illustrator and graphic designer. He served with the U.S. Armed Forces during World War II before becoming a graphic designer in the 1950s.

Ameijide served as an illustrator a variety of clients, including Fortune, National Geographic, IBM, Pfizer, TV Guide, Chase Manhattan, Discover, Harcourt Brace and the United States Post Office.  He won numerous awards for his illustrations from various organizations and clubs, such as the Art Directors Club. His work is honored by the book The Illustrator In America 1880–1980 A Century of Illustration by Walt and Roger Reed.

Ameijide employed 3-D layering of cutouts of various colored papers to create his caricatures, having originated and developed paper and felt sculptures, which were then photographed, as illustrations in the mid-1950s.

References

External links
January 12, 2000 Obituary 

1924 births
2000 deaths
United States Army personnel of World War II
American graphic designers
American illustrators
Artists from Newark, New Jersey
People from Cortlandt Manor, New York